Yanacocha (possibly from Quechua yana black, very dark, qucha lake, lagoon, "black lake") is a lake in Peru located in the Cusco Region, Urubamba Province, Huaylllabamba District. Yanacocha as well as the nearby lakes named Chaquicocha and Kellococha (Quechua for "yellow lake") is known for its woods of polylepis. It is situated high up on the mountain named Chaquicocha.

See also 
 Machu Qullqa

References 

Lakes of Peru
Lakes of Cusco Region